= Feminism and Politics =

1989 nonfiction book by Joyce Gelb

Feminism and Politics: A Comparative Perspective
- Author: Joyce Gelb
- Language: English
- Publisher: University of California Press
- Publication date: 1989
- Pages: 267
- ISBN: 978-0-520-07184-1

Feminism and Politics: A Comparative Perspective is a non-fiction book written by Joyce Gelb, published in 1989 by the University of California Press. In it, she argues that gender-based women's groups separate from institutions like political parties are more likely to develop independent strategies and, thus, may have a greater political impact. It compares the feminist movement in Sweden, the United States, and the United Kingdom and is based on over 200 interviews Gelb conducted with feminist activists, academics, and politicians. She contends that feminist movements in the United States are most effective in enacting change because they most closely align with this model of greater independence.
